Galina Vasilievna Kmit (16 December 1921 – 20 April 2019) was a  Soviet and Russian photographer, photo artist, photo correspondent. Honored Art worker of the Russian Federation.

Biography
Born in Odessa in the family of Ukrainian writer Vasyl Radysh.

For many years she worked in the APN / RIA Novosti. She was a member of the Union of Cinematographers and Journalists of Russia, an academician, a member of the Russian-Italian Research Academy Ferroni, a corresponding member of the National Academy of  Cinematic Arts and Sciences. Yuri Luzhkov, Oleg Tabakov, Vyacheslav Tikhonov, Stanislav Govorukhin, Elena Yakovleva, Nikita Mikhalkov and many others became the heroes of her photographs.

Her husband was Leonid Kmit, a Soviet theater and film actor, People’s Artist of the RSFSR. From this marriage, the daughter Irina  (born 1948) is a screenwriter, actress, novelist, and journalist.

References

External links 

 Ярчайшие фотографии советской эпохи в работах гениальных фотомастеров 
 

1921 births
2019 deaths
Artists from Odesa
Soviet photographers
Russian photographers
Russian photojournalists
Honored Artists of the Russian Federation
Russian women photographers
Soviet women photographers
20th-century Russian photographers
Women photojournalists